Line A is name of several transport lines:
A (New York City Subway service), U.S.
Line A (Buenos Aires Underground), Argentina
A Line (Los Angeles Metro), U.S.
Line A (Prague Metro), Czech Republic
Line A (Rome Metro), Italy
Mexico City Metro Line A,  Mexico City
Line A (EuskoTran), Bilbao, Spain (former name)

See also
 A Train (disambiguation)
 A-line (disambiguation)